KMTG (89.3 FM) is a radio station broadcasting student choice format. Licensed to San Jose, California, United States, the station serves the San Jose area.  The station is currently owned by San Jose Unified School District. and operated at Pioneer High School by Pioneer High School students. It was formerly known as KLEL started by Joe LoBue who instructed radio as a class and operated the station from Leland High School.

The station is completely student-run, educational, and non-profit. The students doing shows on the station do so as part of formal classes in broadcasting and under the supervision of the station manager. The station manager, Steve Dini, a teacher at the high school and himself a radio personality, is still active in the broadcasting field doing television commercials and writing for local radio and TV.

The format of the station is varied depending on the student shows that have been properly proposed and implemented. The station operates 24 hours a day.  When the station is not featuring student shows, it continues to broadcast a mix of today's and yesterday's top music using computer automation.

One of the student shows is titled "Teal Talk", a sports radio show that covers the San Jose Sharks. Recently, the Teal Talk anchors interviewed Dan Rusanowsky, the San Jose Sharks radio play-by-play announcer.

References

External links
Official Site
KLEL Retrospective Site

San José Unified School District
MTG
Mass media in San Jose, California
High school radio stations in the United States